The hybrid elm cultivar Ulmus × hollandica 'Elegantissima' was the name given by A. R. Horwood in his Flora of Leicestershire and Rutland (1933) to an elm found in those counties  and later identified by Melville as a natural hybrid between Wych Elm and Plot Elm. According to Melville, the hybrid occurs in the main areas of Plot Elm distribution, where it is more common than Plot Elm itself. The tree is sometimes known simply as the 'Midlands Elm'.

The tree should not be confused with U. suberosa (: minor?) elegantissima Hort. listed by Kirchner, in Kirchner & Petzold's Arboretum Muscaviense (1864), as a synonym for U. minor 'Viminalis Variegata' (:'Marginata').

Description
Bean, following Melville, says the hybrid is variable in form, combining characteristics of Wych Elm and Plot Elm. The tree is said to have rather narrow leaves of leathery texture.

Pests and diseases
'Elegantissima' is susceptible to Dutch elm disease.

Cultivation
Hybrids labelled U. glabra × U. plotii survived at Kew Gardens until the 1970s. In 1976 and 1980, Melville found several in Didcot, at the Power Station, and Foscot Copse. No mature specimens are known to survive, though examples have been reported in the Brighton enclave. The tree is not known to have been introduced to North America. An U. glabra × U. plotii appears in the current (2022) elm-list of Royal Botanic Gardens Victoria (Melbourne), Australia.

Synonymy
Ulmus montana (: glabra) var. etrusca: Nicholson in Kew Hand-List Trees & Shrubs 2: 139. 1896 (?).

Cultivars
'Balder', 'Freja', 'Jacqueline Hillier', 'Loke', 'Odin', 'Tyr'.

References

External links
  Sheet labelled Ulmus glabra [Huds.] × Ulmus plotii, = U. × elegantissima Horwood; from West Bar St, Banbury, Oxfordshire, 1937 (Oxford University Herbarium) 
  Sheet labelled Ulmus plotii × Ulmus glabra [Huds.], Ware, Hertfordshire, 1937 (Melville)  
  Sheet labelled Ulmus glabra Huds. × Ulmus plotii, Caythorpe, Nottinghamshire, 1957 (Howitt)
  

Dutch elm cultivar
Ulmus articles missing images
Ulmus